Starý Šachov is a municipality and village in Děčín District in the Ústí nad Labem Region of the Czech Republic. It has about 200 inhabitants.

Administrative parts
The village of Malý Šachov is an administrative part of Starý Šachov.

References

Villages in Děčín District